The Trud Stadium is a multi-purpose stadium in Tomsk, Russia.  It is currently used mostly for football matches and is the home ground of FC Tom' Tomsk.  The stadium holds 10,000. It was built in 1929 and opened on 1 June.

History 

Prior to their promotion to the Russian First Division, Trud lacked many facilities common to many European stadiums, including proper toilets.  Once the team advanced and received increased sponsorship money, there were new stands built to increase the capacity of the stadium.  The field was also improved with a subterranean heating system to contend with Siberian snowfalls.

References

External links 

 Stadium picture from World Stadiums

Football venues in Russia
FC Tom Tomsk
Multi-purpose stadiums in Russia
Buildings and structures in Tomsk Oblast
Sport in Tomsk